Maltby is a census-designated place (CDP) in Snohomish County, Washington. The population was 10,830 at the 2010 census.

History
Maltby was first settled in 1887, and named for real estate dealer Robert Maltby.

Geography

Maltby is located north of Woodinville and south of Snohomish, at the intersection of State Route 522 and State Route 524. It uses Snohomish and Woodinville addresses and is served by city services from Monroe.

According to the United States Census Bureau, the CDP has a total area of 16.8 square miles (43.6 km2), of which, 16.8 square miles (43.4 km2) of it is land and 0.1 square miles (0.2 km2) of it (0.36%) is water.

Demographics
As of the census of 2000, there were 8,267 people, 2,824 households, and 2,335 families residing in the CDP. The population density was 492.9 people per square mile (190.3/km2). There were 2,897 housing units at an average density of 172.7/sq mi (66.7/km2). The racial makeup of the CDP was 94.12% White, 0.29% African American, 0.47% Native American, 2.38% Asian, 0.16% Pacific Islander, 0.64% from other races, and 1.94% from two or more races. Hispanic or Latino of any race were 2.13% of the population.

There were 2,824 households, out of which 41.9% had children under the age of 18 living with them, 74.6% were married couples living together, 4.5% had a female householder with no husband present, and 17.3% were non-families. 12.3% of all households were made up of individuals, and 2.8% had someone living alone who was 65 years of age or older. The average household size was 2.93 and the average family size was 3.19.

In the CDP, the age distribution of the population shows 28.5% under the age of 18, 5.7% from 18 to 24, 31.3% from 25 to 44, 28.5% from 45 to 64, and 6.0% who were 65 years of age or older. The median age was 38 years. For every 100 females, there were 104.4 males. For every 100 females age 18 and over, there were 105.1 males.

The median income for a household in the CDP was $77,534, and the median income for a family was $80,543. Males had a median income of $53,209 versus $36,719 for females. The per capita income for the CDP was $29,330. About 1.9% of families and 3.6% of the population were below the poverty line, including 4.1% of those under age 18 and 6.2% of those age 65 or over. Based on per capita income, Maltby ranks 40th of 522 ranked areas in the state of Washington.

Despite population growth in recent years, Maltby is part of unincorporated Snohomish County.

Tourism

A small shopping district is located at the center of Maltby and includes the Maltby Cafe, which is noted for its cinnamon rolls. The Maltby Cafe is located in a former school gymnasium and is adjacent to several boutique shops in the former Maltby School.

References

Census-designated places in Snohomish County, Washington
Census-designated places in Washington (state)